Maggie Eckford or Margaret Eckford (born November 21, 1985), known by her stage name Ruelle, is an American singer-songwriter. Her music has been used on television series such as the opening theme songs of Dynasties ("Game of Survival"), Shadowhunters ("This Is the Hunt"), and The Shannara Chronicles ("Until We Go Down").

Background 

Born the middle child of three sisters, Eckford grew up in Hattiesburg, Mississippi and attended a private Christian high school. She attended music school in Sydney, Australia. Ruelle is now based in Nashville, Tennessee. Her mother's family owns a legacy music store in Wales, where her interest for music began.

Ruelle's first two albums, For What It's Worth (2010) and Show and Tell (2012), released under her birth name, Maggie Eckford, were indie pop. She then adopted the stage name, the French word , due to its French roots and its multiple meanings, and moved towards electronic pop with EPs, Up in Flames (2015), Madness (2016), and Rival (2017).

Ruelle's first television placement was a song in a Japanese iPad commercial. Alongside the theme songs for Shadowhunters and The Shannara Chronicles, her songs have also been included in prime time television series, including 9-1-1, Arrow, Batwoman, Inhumans, Dancing with the Stars, The Challenge XXX: Dirty 30, Cloak & Dagger, Eyewitness, Famous in Love, Grey's Anatomy, Guilt, How to Get Away with Murder, The Leftovers, Midnight, Texas, The Originals, Pretty Little Liars, Quantico, Reckless, Reign, Revenge, Riverdale, Scream, Sleepy Hollow, So You Think You Can Dance, Teen Wolf, Titans, The Vampire Diaries, The Walking Dead, Wynonna Earp, Doom Patrol (TV series)  and The Village.

She was included in both the trailer and the soundtrack for The Loft as well as trailers for Bad Moms, Before I Fall, Free State of Jones, and Keeping up with the Joneses. Her song, "Game of Survival", was included in the 13 Reasons Why trailer, the Gears 5 trailer, and the trailer for David Attenborough's BBC Earth series Dynasties. Her songs, "Madness" and "Rivals", were included in the TV show, Siren, and in the trailer for The Looming Tower miniseries respectively. In July 2018, the released trailer for the Titans series by DC Universe includes "Madness", "Monsters" and "Revolution". She also released the song, "Take it All" used in a trailer for the British soap, Emmerdale. The song "Slip Away" was included in a season 2 episode of Midnight, Texas. The song "Carry You" was included in an episode of the Fox drama series, 9-1-1, during season 3, episode 15. 

In January 2019, "Wake Up World", a collaborative track with Unsecret, was used for the first teaser of the STARZ exclusive limited series, The Spanish Princess. "I AM", a collaboration with Club Yoko, was in the Samsung Galaxy Note 10 commercials.

Her single, "Good Day for Dreaming", was featured in Apple's iPhone 12 lineup launch event in October 2020.

Her song "Madness" was included in the soundtrack of the limited Netflix series, Behind Her Eyes in 2021.

She has collaborated with electronic music producer Ki Theory, featuring in his song, "Bringing Me Down". She was the sole feature on NF's chart-topping 2017 album Perception, providing vocals on the song, "10 Feet Down",

Her album, Earth Glow, was released on August 7, 2019, with five songs and then another EP soon after with another five songs, choosing to split her album in two in order to draw more attention to all songs. A fellow artist and close friend wrote "Like You Mean It" with Ruelle, alongside mutual friend Jeremy Lutito who also co-produced the EP. The second EP, Exodus, was released on the November 22, 2019.

Discography

As Maggie Eckford

Albums 
For What It's Worth
 "Couldn't I See "
 "Over and Over"
 "Asleep "
 "Don't Ask Me"
 "My Own Way Down"
 "For What It's Worth"
 "Unexpected"
 "You'll Still Be Mine"
 "Raindrops"

Show and Tell
 "Come and Go"
 "The Pirate and the Mermaid"
 "Show and Tell"
 "What If"
 "Leave"
 "Too Far Gone"
 "Two Worlds"
 "What Are We Waiting For"
 "Something for Me"
 "Lullaby"

Singles 
 "Golden"
 "Christmas Like We Do"
 "Tell Me How to Feel"
 "Ghost" (2014)
 "Let the Light Back In" (2015)
 "Everything Is Lost" (2015)

As Ruelle

Albums 
Ode to Shadows (2019)
 "Monsters"
 "War of Hearts"
 "Invincible"
 "The Other Side"
 "Bad Dream"
 "Where We Come Alive"
 "Carry You" (featuring Fleurie)
 "Where Do We Go from Here"
 "Recover"
 "Storm"
 "I Get to Love You"
 "Hold Your Breath"
 "Fire meets Fate"

EP's 
Up In Flames (2015)
 "Up in Flames"
 "Fear on Fire"
 "Big Guns"
 "Oh My My"
 "War of Hearts"
 "Until We Go Down"

Madness (2016)
 "Madness"
 "Bad Dream"
 "Where Do We Go from Here"
 "Live Like Legends"
 "Daydream"
 "Game of Survival"
 "Closing In"

Rival (2017)
 "Dead of Night"
 "Secrets and Lies"
 "Recover"
 "Find You"
 "Rival"
 "The Other Side"

Emerge (2018)
 "Emerge Part I"
 "Emerge Part II"
 "Genesis"
 "Come Fly with Me"
 "Empires"
 "Hold Your Breath"
 "Waves of Gray"

Earth Glow (2019)
 "Can't Stand Still"
 "Earth Glow"
 "What Dreams Are Made of"
 "Like You Mean It"
 "Take It Out On You"

Exodus (2019)
 "What Are We Waiting For"
 "Exodus"
 "Skin and Bones"
 "The Fear of Letting Go"
 "Ten Years"

Singles 
 "Take It All" (2015)
 "Deep End" (2015)
 "Monsters" (2015)
 "I Get to Love You" (2016)
 "Storm" (2016)
 "Until We Go Down (Listenbe"e remix)
 "Gotta Love It" (2016)
 "Monsters" (acoustic version) 
 "War of Hearts" (acoustic version) 
 "Carry You" (featuring Fleurie) (2019)
 "Where We Come Alive" (2018)
 "The World We Made" (2019)
 "Love Changes Everything" (2020)
 "Good Day For Dreaming" (2020)

Soundtrack appearances 
 "This Is the Hunt "
 "War of Hearts"
 "I Get to Love You"
 "Secrets and Lies"
 "Trigger"
 "Where We Come Alive"

Featuring
 Super Duper | "Finale" (featuring Ruelle)
 Zayde Wølf | "Walk Through the Fire" (featuring Ruelle)
 Tommee Profitt | "Whose Side Are You On" (featuring Ruelle)
 Ki:Theory | "Bringing Me Down" (remixes)
 "Bringing Me Down" (featuring Ruelle)
 "Bringing Me Down" (Instrumental)
 "Bringing Me Down" (Liam Back remix) [featuring Ruelle]
 "Bringing Me Down" (Bedtimes remix) [featuring Ruelle]
 "Bringing Me Down" (Nerve Leak remix) [featuring Ruelle]
 "Bringing Me Down" (Noisecream remix) [featuring Ruelle]
 "Bringing Me Down" (Hykuu remix) [featuring Ruelle]
 NF | "10 Feet Down" (featuring Ruelle)
 UNSECRET | "Wake Up World" (featuring Ruelle)
 UNSECRET | "Revolution" (featuring Ruelle)
 Happy Walters | "Wonder" (featuring Ruelle)
 Tommee Profitt | "Follow Me" (featuring Ruelle)
 Silverberg | "Giants" (featuring Ruelle)
 Sam Tinnesz | "Play with Fire" (Alternate Version) [featuring Ruelle & Violents]
 Hidden Citizens | "Take Over" (featuring Ruelle)
 UNSECRET | "Slip Away" (featuring Ruelle)
 UNSECRET | "Hang On a Little Longer" (featuring Ruelle)
 Dave | "Lesley" (featuring Ruelle), BPI: Silver
 Future Utopia | "Mountain Girl" (featuring Ruelle)

References

External links
 
 Ruelle on AllMusic.com

1985 births
21st-century American singers
American women singer-songwriters
American indie pop musicians
American YouTubers
Music YouTubers
Synth-pop singers
Living people
Singer-songwriters from Mississippi
Singers from Nashville, Tennessee
21st-century American women singers
Singer-songwriters from Tennessee
Electropop musicians